John Joseph Benoit (December 27, 1951 – December 26, 2016) was an American law enforcement officer and politician; serving in the California State Legislature from 2002 to 2009 and the Riverside County, California Board of Supervisors from 2009 to 2016.

Personal life, education, and career
Born in Kankakee, Illinois, Benoit graduated from Notre Dame High School in Riverside, California, and went on to earn an Associate degree at Riverside Community College in 1974. In 1978, he earned a Bachelor's degree from California State University, Los Angeles, and in 1986 he graduated from the FBI National Academy.  Benoit earned a Master of Public Administration from California State University, San Bernardino, in 1993.

Benoit's law enforcement career spanned 31 years including two years with the Corona, California Police Department, and twenty-nine years with the California Highway Patrol. Benoit served as a member of the Desert Sands Unified School Board from 1999 to 2002. From 2002 to 2008 Benoit served as a Republican Party representative in the California State Assembly, and then served in the California State Senate in 2009. Benoit resigned from the California Senate on November 30, 2009, to serve on the Riverside County, California Board of Supervisors where he served from 2009 until his death in 2016.

Benoit died at his home in Bermuda Dunes, California, from pancreatic cancer.

References

External links
Official Supervisorial web site
Official Campaign web site
"Fastest Lane" Press-Enterprise profile (reg. req’d)
Join California John J. Benoit

1951 births
2016 deaths
School board members in California
County supervisors in California
Republican Party California state senators
Republican Party members of the California State Assembly
People from Riverside, California
Government in Riverside County, California
California State University, Los Angeles alumni
People from Kankakee, Illinois
People from Bermuda Dunes, California
California Highway Patrol
21st-century American politicians
Deaths from pancreatic cancer
Deaths from cancer in California